HMCS Cormorant was a diving support vessel that served in the Canadian Forces. She was equipped with two SDL-1 submersibles. The ship was the first in the Canadian Forces to have women assigned to their crew. Initially constructed as the trawler Aspa Quarto in 1965, the ship was acquired by the Canadian Forces in 1975 and renamed Cormorant. The vessel remained in service until 1997 when Cormorant was sold to a US buyer. The ship was laid up at Bridgewater, Nova Scotia in 2000 and was removed on 18 November 2020 to be scrapped in Sheet Harbour.

Description

The ship had a complement of 65 which increased to 74 with the introduction of female crew members in 1980. Cormorant carried two SD-1 submersibles in a heated hangar aft. The ship was equipped with two Decca 1229 navigational radars.

Service history
The vessel was built as the Italian-owned stern trawler Aspa Quarto at Cantiere Navale Apuania, Marine-Carrara in Italy. Aspa Quarto was laid down on 8 December 1963, launched on 11 April 1965 and completed on 15 June 1965. She was purchased in July 1975 and taken to Davie Shipbuilding at Lauzon, Quebec where the ship underwent conversion to a diving support vessel. The ship was commissioned into Maritime Command on 10 November 1978 at Lauzon, becoming the second Canadian naval unit to bear this name.

In 1980, the first mixed gender crew trial took place aboard Cormorant in response to the recommendations of the Royal Commission on the Status of Women. The trial lasted until 1984. Among those serving on board during this trial was Louise Fish, acting as the supply officer.

Between 23 August and 5 October 1989, Cormorant and  conducted defence research as part of Operation Norploy 89, which took place in the Arctic region of Canada, mainly in Baffin Bay, Lancaster Sound and the Davis Strait. Using the submersible SDL-1 deployed from Cormorant, the sunken vessel  was discovered, a ship not seen since its sinking in 1853.

She was decommissioned on 2 July 1997 and sold to United States owners for diving operations. The ship underwent conversion to an offshore support vessel in 1998 however the ship was docked in Bridgewater, Nova Scotia in 2000 and has remained there. As of March 2015, the ship developed a severe list. As of 21 March 2015, the ship had sunk in the LaHave River due to the amount of ice on the deck. The Canadian Coast Guard took control of the salvage effort in May due to pollution concerns.

The ship was refloated with the list reduced to 8 degrees. Salvage was anticipated to be completed in another week. The ownership of the vessel remains unclear, with lawsuits claiming that a Texas-based company and the Port of Bridgewater own the ship, and therefore liable for the cleanup. The Port of Bridgewater claims that the vessel's sinking was due to sabotage and that the ship's thru-hull valves had been opened. The ship remained at laid up in Bridgewater, Nova Scotia due to the ongoing court case. In October 2020, RJ MacIsaac Construction of Antigonish, Nova Scotia was awarded the federal government tender to dispose of the ship. On 18 November 2020, the ex-Cormorant was towed out of Bridgwater Harbour for scrapping at Sheet Harbour. Demolition of the ship was declared completed on 7 July 2021.

The ship's bell of HMCS Cormorant is currently on loan to a Navy League Cadet Corps in British Columbia. The Christening Bells Project at Canadian Forces Base Esquimalt Naval and Military Museum includes information from the ship's bell of HMCS Cormorant, which was used for baptism of babies on board ship.

References

Citations

References

External links
 HMCS Cormorant (II) - hazegray.org
 HMCS Comorant I
 Cormorant is on the Rise by LighthouseNow

Auxiliary ships of the Royal Canadian Navy
1965 ships